The Scalplock Mountain Fire Lookout in Glacier National Park is significant as one of a chain of staffed fire lookout posts within the park. The low two-story timber-construction structure with a pyramidal roof was built in 1931. The lookout affords views into the Park Creek valley and the Middle Fork of the Flathead River, which was traversed by the Great Northern Railway (U.S.) and US 2, prolific sources of fires. The lookout was built to standard plans derived from U.S. Forest Service plans.

References

External links
 at the National Park Service's NRHP database

Towers completed in 1931
Fire lookout towers on the National Register of Historic Places in Montana
Rustic architecture in Montana
National Register of Historic Places in Flathead County, Montana
1931 establishments in Montana
National Register of Historic Places in Glacier National Park